The following is a list of the all-time leading NCAA Division I FBS (Football Bowl Subdivision)  college football single-opponent winning streaks. Streaks are ranked by the number of consecutive wins posted by one team against a regular opponent. All streaks active and historical streaks of at least 20 games are included.  

This list excludes rivalries involving current Division I Football Championship Subdivision (FCS) schools, and thus excludes the all-time NCAA record for most consecutive wins by one rival over another: Yale (now an FCS team) beat Wesleyan University (Connecticut) (now a Division III team) 46 times in a row between 1875 and 1913. The two teams have not played each other since that 1913 game (which Yale won at home, 21-0).

The FCS record for most consecutive wins by one team over another in an uninterrupted series is 32 victories in a row by Grambling over Prairie View between 1977 and 2009; this streak includes the 1990 season, when Prairie View's team went into recess due to a lack of players and financial problems. That streak began when Grambling was in the old Division I and Prairie View was in Division II.

† Active Streaks in bold

References and sources

, 

Lists of college football team records